Eurycotis is a genus of cockroaches. Cockroaches of this genus often have the capability to secrete an unpleasant smell when threatened. Both sexes have a large gland in the rear part of the abdomen capable of secreting a milky, acidic fluid as either an oozing liquid, or up to a three-foot spray.

References 

Cockroach genera